Jonjo Shelvey (born 27 February 1992) is an English professional footballer who plays as a midfielder for  club Nottingham Forest.

Shelvey began his career at Charlton Athletic, becoming their youngest-ever player at 16 years and 59 days old. In 2010, he moved to Liverpool for an initial £1.7 million, spending a brief loan at Blackpool. During his time at Anfield, Shelvey was part of a Liverpool squad which won the League Cup and lost the FA Cup final in 2012. He joined Swansea City for £5 million in 2013, and Newcastle United for £12 million two and a half years later. A month after joining Newcastle, he was made the team's stand-in captain in the absence of Fabricio Coloccini, as the season ended with relegation. He has since helped the club regain Premier League status, and established himself as Newcastle's vice captain.

Shelvey played for England at under-16, under-17, under-19 and under-21 level and has captained the under-19 team. He won his first cap for the senior team in 2012.

Club career

Charlton Athletic

Shelvey played in the youth teams of first Arsenal and then West Ham United, the team he had supported as a boy. In 2004, he moved to Charlton Athletic, making his breakthrough in the 2007–08 season after scoring 14 goals in 23 appearances for Charlton's under-18 team. He made his first-team debut on 26 April 2008, starting in a 3–0 away loss against Barnsley in the Championship. He became Charlton's youngest-ever player, at the age of 16 years and 59 days – beating the previous holder, Paul Konchesky. He still had one week of school remaining when he was given his debut by manager Alan Pardew.

On 3 January 2009, Shelvey became Charlton's youngest-ever goal-scorer, with a strike against Norwich City in the third round of the FA Cup, opening a 1–1 draw. It was 54 days before his 17th birthday, breaking the previous record held by Peter Reeves who was aged 17 years and 100 days when he scored – also against Norwich – in May 1996. Despite interest from several Premier League clubs, on 27 February, his 17th birthday, Shelvey signed his first professional contract with Charlton. He scored his first league goal in the 3–2 win at Southampton on 4 April. Later that month, he scored in consecutive matches, 2–2 home draws against Blackpool and Cardiff City; the season ended with relegation to League One.

In September 2009, he signed a one-year contract extension until 2012. Shelvey contributed four goals from 24 league appearances as the Addicks reached the promotion play-offs.

Liverpool

Shelvey signed for Liverpool in May 2010, for an initial fee of £1.7 million. Shelvey made his debut for the club as an extra-time substitute on 22 September in the Reds' shock League Cup third-round defeat against League Two team Northampton Town at Anfield, with Liverpool losing 4–2 on penalties (with Shelvey scoring in the shootout) after a 2–2 draw. Shelvey started his first match for the club in Liverpool's Europa League group match against Napoli on 21 October 2010, playing the whole 90 minutes match in a 0–0 draw. On 24 October, Shelvey made his Premier League debut against Blackburn Rovers at Anfield, coming on for the final stages in place of Raul Meireles in the Reds' 2–1 win.

Shelvey joined Championship club Blackpool on loan on 30 September 2011. The following day he scored on his debut, in a 5–0 win against Bristol City at Bloomfield Road, and also scored his first professional hat-trick in a 5–0 win away at Leeds United on 3 November.

On 30 November 2011, he was recalled by Liverpool due to injury problems within the team, mainly surrounding Steven Gerrard and Lucas Leiva, with the latter set to miss the remainder of the season. He made his first ever Premier League start the following weekend against Aston Villa. On 6 January 2012 he scored his first senior goal for the club in a 5–1 win in a third round FA Cup tie against Oldham Athletic at Anfield, and on 8 May he scored his first Premier League goal with a 30-yard strike in a 4–1 home win over Chelsea. He was absent from Liverpool's win over Cardiff City in the season's League Cup Final, and was an unused substitute in their loss to Chelsea in the FA Cup equivalent.

On 10 July 2012, Shelvey signed a new long-term contract with Liverpool. On 20 September 2012 he came off the bench to score the last 2 goals in a 5–3 win against Young Boys in the Europa League. Three days later, he was sent off in a league match against Manchester United on 23 September 2012. He finished the Europa League group stage with four goals, adding one each in a home defeat to Udinese on 4 October, and a draw with Young Boys on 22 November.

Swansea City
On 3 July 2013, Shelvey signed a four-year contract with Swansea City, for an initial transfer fee of £5 million. He scored his first goal for the club on 16 September 2013, in a 2–2 draw with former club Liverpool, also assisting teammate Michu's goal, but was partly responsible for both Liverpool goals, giving the ball away to Daniel Sturridge and Victor Moses. He scored a goal on 26 April 2014 in a 4–1 defeat of Aston Villa; from Brad Guzan's clearance, Shelvey "controlled the ball with one touch before propelling it over the back-pedalling American's head and into the net."

Shelvey was sent off in a goalless draw at Everton on 1 November 2014, by getting two bookings. First, he kicked the ball away in the 24th minute, then in the 72nd minute, he blocked James McCarthy's run, resulting in the second booking. On 29 December, he caught Liverpool's Emre Can with his arm during a 4–1 away defeat. Although referee Andre Marriner did not punish him for it, the Football Association later gave Shelvey a four-match suspension for violent conduct, with one match having been added to the suspension because of his previous dismissal against Everton. He claimed that the act was unintentional and personally apologised to Can. The day before the Liverpool match, Swansea manager Garry Monk criticised Shelvey's disciplinary record, telling him to "wise up" and put a stop to an accumulation of yellow cards earned through "laziness".

In July 2015, Shelvey signed a new, four-year deal with the Swans, which would have kept him at the club until the summer of 2019.

On 10 January 2016, following a shock 3–2 defeat to League Two team Oxford United in the FA Cup, Shelvey appeared to become embroiled in a row with one Swansea fan and then appeared to invite the man to meet him outside. Manager Alan Curtis responded stating "we expect more from Jonjo, it is as simple as that".

Newcastle United

On 12 January 2016, Newcastle United announced they had signed Shelvey on a five-and-a-half-year deal, for a reported fee of £12 million. Four days later he made his debut in a 2–1 Premier League victory over West Ham United, the first win for the club in seven matches. He was named man of the match for his involvement in the build-up to both of Newcastle's goals.

While Newcastle were on a training break in La Manga on 20 February, manager Steve McClaren announced that Shelvey had been made the team's captain. He served the role as Fabricio Coloccini stayed out through a calf injury, and said that he wanted to help the club avoid relegation; they were unsuccessful in that aim.

Shelvey scored his first goal for the club in a 2–0 win against Brighton & Hove Albion on 27 August 2016. In December 2016, Shelvey was banned for five matches after being found guilty of using racially abusive language towards Wolverhampton Wanderers player, Romain Saïss, in a match on 17 September. He was also fined £100,000 and ordered to attend a Football Association education course. He made 47 appearances and scored 5 goals in 2016–17 as Newcastle were promoted to the Premier League after winning the Championship title.

Ahead of the new season, Shelvey changed his squad number from 12 to 8. On 13 August 2017, in Newcastle United's first match back in the Premier League against Tottenham Hotspur, Shelvey was sent off three minutes into the second half of the match, for stamping on Tottenham midfielder Dele Alli. Newcastle would go on to lose the match 2–0, with Shelvey later apologising for his violent conduct.
On matchday two of the 2019–20 Premier League campaign, Shelvey scored his first of the season, a right footed shot into the far corner from the left edge of the six-yard box in a 3–1 away defeat to Norwich City. However, the goal was merely consolation following a poor performance from the Magpies. On 30 November 2019, Shelvey scored a late equalizer, described by BBC Sport as a "stunner", against defending league champions Manchester City in a 2–2 draw.

International career

Youth
Shelvey captained the England under-16s as they won the 2007 Victory Shield scoring three goals in three matches. He played a key role in the Montaigu Tournament, which England won for the first time in seven years, playing in all four matches and scoring a free kick in the final against France. In October 2008, he made his debut for the England under-17s and scored in a 7–0 win over Estonia.

On his debut for the England under-19s, in September 2010, he captained and scored a free-kick in a 2–0 win over Slovakia, and followed up by scoring on his following two appearances for the team. He won his first Under-21 cap coming on as substitute in a 6–0 win against Azerbaijan in September 2011.

England's senior manager Roy Hodgson claimed that Shelvey missed the 2015 UEFA European Under-21 Championship because he was "reticent" about playing at that level following his senior international debut. Shelvey responded by saying that he had been told by under-21 manager Gareth Southgate that he would not feature in that squad, and claimed that if he had ever refused international duty he would have faced the wrath of his father.

Senior
Shelvey was eligible to play for Scotland – through his grandfather – and the Republic of Ireland, but chose to represent England. In October 2012 Shelvey was called up for the England squad for two 2014 FIFA World Cup qualification matches against San Marino and Poland, and made his senior debut from the bench on 12 October 2012, in a 5–0 home win against San Marino, replacing Michael Carrick in the 66th minute.

On 5 September 2015, Shelvey was selected to start for England for the first time in a UEFA Euro 2016 qualifying match against San Marino, becoming the first man to be capped for England whilst playing for Swansea City. He was named man of the match by the BBC as England ran out 6–0 winners in Serravalle.

Personal life
Shelvey was born in Romford, Greater London and grew up in a council flat in Harold Hill. Due to crime in the neighbourhood, he bought his sister a home in Brentwood when she became pregnant. His older brother George was, according to Shelvey, a better footballer, but his career was ruined by drinking and partying. Shelvey is of partial Scottish and Irish Traveller heritage.

Shelvey fell down a staircase as a baby, one of several childhood traumas which he believes could have caused his alopecia. He was prescribed a cream and told to sleep in a woolly hat for a month in order to combat it, but abandoned treatment because of the discomfort it caused, and said of his baldness, "If you don't like it, don't talk to me". Shelvey has supported youngsters who share his condition.

In June 2015, Shelvey married Daisy Evans, formerly of the pop group S Club 8. Comedian Jimmy Carr performed at the marriage. The couple have a daughter, born the previous year.

Career statistics

Club

International
Source:

Honours
Liverpool
FA Cup runner-up: 2011–12

Newcastle United
EFL Championship: 2016–17

Individual
PFA Team of the Year: 2016–17 Championship

References

External links

Profile at the Nottingham Forest F.C. website

1992 births
Living people
Footballers from Romford
English footballers
England youth international footballers
England under-21 international footballers
England international footballers
Association football midfielders
Arsenal F.C. players
West Ham United F.C. players
Charlton Athletic F.C. players
Liverpool F.C. players
Blackpool F.C. players
Swansea City A.F.C. players
Newcastle United F.C. players
Nottingham Forest F.C. players
English Football League players
Premier League players
English people of Irish descent
English people of Scottish descent
Irish Travellers from England
Irish Traveller sportspeople
People with alopecia universalis